Mantridae is a family of crustaceans belonging to the order Cyclopoida.

Genera:
 Chamicola Ohtsuka, Boxshall & Torigoe, 2000
 Mantra Leigh-Sharpe, 1934
 Nearchinotodelphys Ummerkutty, 1961

References

Cyclopoida